Gas Guzzlers Extreme is a combat racing game, released on October 8, 2013 for Microsoft Windows. The game uses the PranaEngine, developed by Gamepires. The purpose of the game is to dominate the tracks by racing and/or shooting opponents. The game offers a total of 7 race types such as Classic Race, Power Race, Battle Race, Knockout, Capture The Flag, (Team) Deathmatch, and Last Man Standing. Gas Guzzlers Extreme includes 18 different vehicles and 12 weapons that can be used in 40 tracks and 8 different arenas.

Gameplay 

 Players start out with low performance vehicles and soon work their way up to high-performance models, by earning money in a series of hi-octane races and arena battles. New game modes, tracks and vehicles are unlocked as players progress through the game. Along with developing their driving and fighting skills, players can spend their hard-fought cash, customizing their vehicle to match their clan members or pimping their ride for the road to glory.
 Combat racing at its best, featuring a blood pumping single player campaign with over 12 hours of gameplay
 Multi-path tracks and sponsored events.
 Instant play with vicious AI Bots populating your multiplayer match while other players begin to join in on the fun
 Beautifully displayed high definition visuals with extensive vehicle damage, motion blur effects and custom paint jobs
 Packed with tons of unique humor and personality
 Full integration with Steam – Single-player, multi-player, achievements, leaderboards, Steam Cloud, stats, Valve Anti-Cheat, full controller support (with the Xbox 360 controller) and Steam Trading Cards
 Gas Guzzlers Extreme: Full Metal Frenzy DLC
 Domination Derby: A Destruction Derby with flags.  Keep your flag and try to score points, the player with most points wins.

References

External links 
 Official website

2013 video games
Windows games
Fiction about death games
PlayStation 4 games
Vehicular combat games
Video games developed in Croatia
Video games set in Croatia
Iceberg Interactive games
Xbox One games